Quiet as a Nun is a thriller novel, written by Antonia Fraser. First published in 1977, it features Fraser's sleuthing heroine Jemima Shore as she revisits the convent school where she was educated following the mysterious death of one of the nuns. A six-part television dramatisation of the book (written by Julia Jones) was part of ITV's anthology series Armchair Thriller in 1978.

Plot summary
The novel begins with the death of a nun, Sister Miriam, who apparently starved herself to death in a ruined tower, known as the 'Tower of Ivory', which adjoins the grounds of the Convent of the Blessed Eleanor, a nunnery and a girls' school.

The tower has specific significance to the Order, as it was the original convent building. The tower and the ancient history of the Order are recorded in the Treasury of the Blessed Eleanor, a manuscript that is referenced throughout the story. Though it is never stated explicitly, Blessed Eleanor is presumed to be Eleanor of Aquitaine, who was once Queen of England.

Television reporter Jemima Shore is a former schoolfriend of Sister Miriam, who was also known as Rosabelle Powerstock and was heiress to "the Powers fortune", one of the largest fortunes in Britain. Jemima is invited back to the convent by Reverend Mother Ancilla, where she uncovers a number of mysteries, including the suggestion that Miriam, whose family owned the convent lands, may have written a second will bequeathing them away from the Order, and into the hands of another charity.

The tension builds when the girls at the convent school tell Jemima that the Black Nun, a malevolent faceless spectre reputed to appear whenever a death is about to take place within the grounds, was seen just prior to Sister Miriam's death, and has been sighted again.

Television adaptation
Quiet as a Nun was adapted for television by ITV in 1978, as part of the Armchair Thriller series. The adaptation starred Maria Aitken as Jemima Shore, along with Renée Asherson (Mother Ancilla), Brenda Bruce (Sister Elizabeth) and Sylvia Coleridge (Sister Boniface). Patsy Kensit, then a child, plays one of the convent schoolgirls, Tessa Justin, who has a significant role in the final two episodes.

In the final minutes of the third episode, aired on 18 April 1978, Jemima Shore goes alone into the Tower at night. As she climbs into the attic, she encounters the faceless Black Nun sitting in a rocking chair. Jemima screams as the Black Nun advances towards her, at which point the episode ends. The scene was ranked 63rd in Channel 4's Top 100 Scary Moments list.

Episodes and original airdates
Part One: "The Tower" – 11 April 1978
Part Two: "The Chapel" – 13 April 1978
Part Three: "The Black Nun" – 18 April 1978
Part Four: "Witness And Wills" – 20 April 1978
Part Five: "Powers Of Darkness" – 25 April 1978
Part Six: "Death And Decision" – 27 April 1978

Cast
Maria Aitken as Jemima Shore
Renée Asherson as Mother Ancilla
Brenda Bruce as Sister Elizabeth
David Burke as Tony Amyas, MP
James Laurenson as Alexander Skarbek
Doran Godwin as Sister Lucy
Margaret D'arcy as Sister Clare
Kate Binchy as Sister Edward
Linda Slater as Dodo
Sarah Webb as Margaret
Michelle Winstanley as Blanche
Patsy Kensit as Tessa Justin
Catrina Hylton as Mandy Justin
Mary Healey as Beatrice O'Dowd
James Appleby as Joe
Susan Engel as Sister Agnes
Sylvia Coleridge as Sister Boniface

Crew
 Julia Jones – writer, adaptation
 Moira Armstrong – director
 Jacqueline Davis – producer
 Bill Palmer – production designer
 Roger Webb – incidental music
 Robert Banks Stewart – script editor

DVD release
Network released Armchair Thriller on DVD in 2008, both in separate volumes for each story and as an 11-disc set featuring all of the episodes produced by Thames Television.

References

External links
 
 New York Times review of the ITV adaptation of Quiet as a Nun.
 Interview with Julia Jones, who wrote the ITV adaptation of Quiet as a Nun.

1977 British novels
1978 British television series debuts
British crime novels
ITV television dramas
Novels by Antonia Fraser
1978 British television series endings
Weidenfeld & Nicolson books
Viking Press books
Television shows produced by Thames Television
1970s British drama television series